Phaseolus harmsianus is a species of legume in the family Fabaceae.
It is found only in Ecuador. Its natural habitat is subtropical or tropical moist montane forests.

References

harmsianus
Flora of Ecuador
Data deficient plants
Taxonomy articles created by Polbot